Granta is a literary magazine and publisher.

Granta may also refer to:

Places 
 Lada Granta, Russian car model
 River Granta, a stretch of the River Cam, England
 Granta Park, science, technology, and biomedical park near Cambridge, England
 Granta, Alberta

Other uses 
 A reserve boat of Cambridge University Lightweight Rowing Club